Lycée-Collège d'État Émile Letournel is a combined junior high school and senior high school/sixth-form college on the island of Saint-Pierre, in Saint Pierre and Miquelon. It was named after a famous French orthopaedic surgeon,  (1927-1994), native of Saint-Pierre.

As of the 2016–2017 school year the institution had 161 junior high school students, 119 general senior high/sixth-form students, and 114 vocational high school students, totalling 394 students.

Each year since 2009, the school has awarded a literary prize known as the Récit de l'Ailleurs (meaning "story from elsewhere", in which a jury of students vote for their favourite book from somewhere other than France.

References

External links
 Lycée-Collège d'État Émile Letournel pronotes

Saint Pierre Island
Schools in France